Gum anima, or anima, in pharmacy, is a kind of gum or resin, of which there are two kinds, western and eastern. The first flows from an incision in a tree around Central America, called Courbati; it is transparent, and of a color similar to frankincense.

The eastern gum anima is distinguished into three kinds: the first white; the second blackish, in some respects like myrrh; the third pale, resinous, and dry. All the several kinds of anima have been used in perfumes, by reason of their agreeable smell; they have also been applied externally against colds.

References

Natural gums
Perfumery
Resins
Traditional medicine